Bang You're Dead may refer to:

 Bang! You're Dead, a 1954 British psychological drama film
 Berlin, Appointment for the Spies, a 1965 Italian Eurospy film
 "Bang! You're Dead", a 1961 episode of Alfred Hitchcock Presents directed by Alfred Hitchcock
 A  1985 remake of the 1961 episode

See also
 Bang Bang You're Dead (disambiguation)